Wicat Systems, Inc., was an American computer and software company founded in 1980 in Orem, Utah. Originally a branch of WICAT, the World Institute for Computer-Assisted Teaching (later the Wicat Education Institute), the company manufactured multi-user systems for educational institutions before focusing their efforts on educational software development in the early 1990s. The company was among the first to use the Motorola 68000 microprocessor in a computer with the introduction of the Wicat System 100 in 1980. Both Wicat Systems and its parent institution were founded by Dustin H. Heuston, originally of New York.

History
At its peak in the mid-1980s, Wicat Systems employed 500 and had an annual budget of US$40 million. The company formed a joint venture with Control Data Corporation in early 1985. Named Plato/Wicat after Control Data's Plato educational software, the venture was intended to "address the entire educational process, including computer-based instructional courseware, testing and evaluation, and classroom management and administration".

In 1992, the company was acquired by Jostens in a stock swap valuated at roughly $111 million. Jostens, who had a rival educational software division Jostens Learning which was aimed at preschools, planned to use the Wicat Systems repertoire to increase their presence in high schools and higher education.

Citations

References

 
 
 
 
 
 

1980 establishments in Utah
1992 disestablishments in Utah
1992 mergers and acquisitions
American companies established in 1980
American companies disestablished in 1992
Companies based in Orem, Utah
Computer companies established in 1980
Computer companies disestablished in 1992
Defunct computer companies of the United States
Defunct software companies of the United States
Defunct computer hardware companies